Tanmay Ghosh is an Indian politician from All India Trinamool Congress. In May 2021, he was elected as a member of the West Bengal Legislative Assembly from Bishnupur (constituency). He defeated Archita Bid of All India Trinamool Congress by 11,133 votes in the 2021 West Bengal Assembly election. On 30 August 2021 he joined All India Trinamool Congress.

References 

Living people
Year of birth missing (living people)
21st-century Indian politicians
People from Bankura district
Bharatiya Janata Party politicians from West Bengal
West Bengal MLAs 2021–2026
Trinamool Congress politicians